Allsvenskan 2001, part of the 2001 Swedish football season, was the 77th Allsvenskan season played. The first match was played 7 April 2001 and the last match was played 27 October 2001. Hammarby IF won the league ahead of runners-up Djurgårdens IF, while BK Häcken and Trelleborgs FF were relegated.

Participating clubs

League table

Results

Relegation play-offs 

IFK Norrköping won 4–3 on aggregate.

Season statistics

Top scorers

Attendances

References 

Print
 
 
 

Online
 
 
 
 

Allsvenskan seasons
Swed
Swed
1